The 2016 Emirates Melbourne Cup was the 156th running of the Melbourne Cup, a prestigious Australian Thoroughbred horse race. The date was a public holiday in the state of Victoria. The final field for the race was declared on 29 October. The total prize money for the race was A$6.2 million, the same as the previous year.

The winner was Almandin, ridden by Kerrin McEvoy and trained by Robert Hickmott. Heartbreak City ran second and Hartnell third.
The race was run in 3:20:58 Commentator Greg Miles called his 36th and last Melbourne Cup.

Field

This is a list of horses which ran in the 2016 Melbourne Cup.

See also
 List of Melbourne Cup winners
 List of Melbourne Cup placings

References

2016
Melbourne Cup
Melbourne Cup
2010s in Melbourne
Melbourne Cup